Gelam Kabud (also Romanized as Gelam Kabūd, Gholām Kabūd, and Golom Kabūd) is a village in Beyranvand-e Shomali Rural District, Bayravand District, Khorramabad County, Lorestan Province, Iran. At the 2006 census, its population was 42, in 10 families.

References 

Towns and villages in Khorramabad County